Lee Tire and Rubber Company, now known as Lee Park, is a historic rubber and tire factory complex located in the Spring Mill section of Whitemarsh, Montgomery County, Pennsylvania. The main building was built in 1909, and is a vast, four-story, administration building.  It is a symmetrical structure with terminating and central towers and features engaged Tuscan order columns framing the main entrance doors.  The 12 remaining contributing buildings in the complex include one- and two-story, manufacturing buildings and a water tower (1909).

It was added to the National Register of Historic Places in 1984.

The company was incorporated in 1911 as the successor of the J Ellwood Lee Company established in 1883. Lee manufactured puncture-proof pneumatic tires, regular tires, and rubber sundries. Garthwaite Stadium in Conshohocken is named for the former president, A. A. Garthwaite.

References

Industrial buildings and structures on the National Register of Historic Places in Pennsylvania
Office buildings completed in 1909
Towers completed in 1909
Buildings and structures in Montgomery County, Pennsylvania
National Register of Historic Places in Montgomery County, Pennsylvania